Energy field may refer to:

Pseudoscience
 Energy (esotericism), a term used by writers and practitioners of esoteric forms of spirituality and alternative medicine
 Aura (paranormal), according to New Age beliefs, a colored emanation said to enclose the sides of any animal or object
 Energy field disturbance, a pseudoscientific concept rooted in alternative medicine

Science
 Force field (physics), a vector field that describes a non-contact force acting on a particle at various positions in space
 Electromagnetic field, a physical field produced by electrically charged objects
 Electric field, a vector field surrounding an electric charge that exerts force on other charges
 Magnetic field, a vector field that describes the magnetic influence of electrical currents and magnetized materials
 Gravitational field, a model used to explain the influence that a massive body extends into the space around itself
 Quantum field, a mechanical models of subatomic particles and quasiparticles in condensed matter physics
 Force field (technology), a barrier made of energy, plasma, or particles